Mercedes "Mercy" Athena Thompson is a fictional character and the protagonist of the Mercy Thompson series, written by Patricia Briggs. The main series, which consists of several stories including Moon Called, the short story "Hollow", and the most recent, thirteen novel Soul Taken, is narrated primarily from Mercy's point of view. The character also has a comic series by Dynamite which includes the prequel Homecoming, a comic adaptation of Moon Called, and an original story, Hopcross Jilly.

History
In the novels, Mercy Thompson is the daughter of a Blackfeet father and a white teenage mother.  Her father, Old Joe Coyote, was a rodeo bull rider, who died a few days after consummating his relationship with her mother, Margi. In the novel Fire Touched, it is stated that her mother and father were together for a 'couple months' prior to his death. Mercy inherits a gift from her father, giving her just enough of an edge to survive amongst the werewolves, fae, and other creatures that may want to eat her during the night; she is a "Walker"—a Native American shapeshifter not linked to the moon, who turns into a coyote. 

One day, not too long after Mercy was born, her mother went to the crib only to find a small coyote pup in her place. Afraid and unsure how to raise her, Margi took her to the only people she knew were capable—friends of an uncle who had been a werewolf. This is how she came to be raised with the pack of Bran, the Marrok of the werewolves.

Appearances

Homecoming
A prequel story.  In Homecoming, a graphic novel, Mercy travels to the Tri-Cities of Washington for a job interview and quickly finds herself smack-dab in the middle of a gang war between rival packs of werewolves. And as if fangs and fur were not bad enough, Mercy must deal with the scariest creature of all: her mother, who is convinced that Mercy is making a mess of her life and determined to set her daughter on the right course.

Moon Called
Moon Called is the beginning of the story of Mercedes Thompson. Mercy's life is not exactly normal. Her next-door neighbor is a werewolf, her former boss is a grumpy old fae, and she is fixing a Volkswagen bus for a vampire. But then, Mercy is not exactly normal herself.

She's a walker, not only capable of shifting into coyote shape at will but also possessed of a sharp nose for scenting other creatures and an ability to sense magic when it is at work. So when a teenage werewolf approaches Mercy asking for work, she knows what he is immediately. She also knows it would be more prudent to refuse him, but he looks so desperate that she hires him anyway.

Turns out the werewolf, who goes by Mac, has escaped from a laboratory where he was being experimented on. When bad guys show up looking for him and Mercy kills one of them, also a werewolf, she realizes it's time to turn the matter over to the local Alpha werewolf, who also happens to be her next-door divorced neighbor Adam.

Before you can say "from the frying pan into the fire," things go awry and Mercy finds and just barely saves a wounded Adam, whose fifteen-year-old daughter Jesse has been kidnapped by the same people who came after Mac. To help Adam heal, Mercy must take him to Montana, and the pack of werewolves who raised her. There we meet Bran, leader of all the North American werewolves, whose son Samuel is the man whom Mercy once loved and lost.

Eventually, Adam, Samuel and Mercy return to the Tri-Cities to search for Adam's missing daughter. In the process they have encounters with fae, vampires, other werewolves, and a witch or two. Mercy must contend not only with all these creatures but with Adam and Samuel's interest in her and the territorial contentiousness that results from it.

Blood Bound
In Blood Bound we learn that Mercy is somewhat resistant to some magics such as vampire compulsion or werewolf pack control. Because of her magic resistance, vampire friend Stefan calls upon her to deliver a message to a visiting vampire who has failed to pay the proper respects to Stefan’s seethe. Stefan is fearful that the visiting vampire has some type of magic that can compel him to do things he would not ordinarily do and that Mercy is hopefully immune and will be able to report back to his seethe should anything happen to him.

Of course, things go badly and soon Mercy is wrapped up in a hunt for the vampiric sorcerer Cory Littleton, who is causing the Tri Cities area to have an increased rise in violence, harming werewolf friends, and endangering lives of innocents. To complicate things, her feelings for Adam, the local Alpha, are scaring her and her feelings for Samuel, an old flame, appear unresolved. Throw in a bit of vampire, fae, and werewolf politics.

Iron Kissed
In Iron Kissed we find Mercy at a crossroads in her relationships with the two men in her life, Samuel and Adam Hauptman. Both are extremely dominant werewolves, although Samuel is a lone wolf and Adam is the alpha of the Tri Cities werewolf pack. Mercy must decide which one she loves more because Adam has declared his feelings for her and her lack of definitive response is weakening the pack.

When her mechanic mentor, Siebold Adelbertsmiter a.k.a. Zee, calls upon her to repay a favor to the Fae, she is grateful for the distraction. There have been several unsolved murders on the Fae reservation and the magic on which the fae can call without incurring the wrath of the Grey Lords has been insufficient in finding the perpetrator. Mercy is called in to use her nose to see if she can find an identifying scent of the murderer.

She finds their murderer, and identifies him to Zee. Shortly thereafter she learns that Zee was caught by police at the house of the Fae's killer, with the body of the murderer, and as such is charged with murder. The Fae want a quick cover-up so as not to arouse anti-fae sentiments, and Zee wants Mercy out of it so that she will not anger the Grey Lords and get herself in more trouble. Regardless, Mercy throws herself into finding the real killer and exonerating Zee.

Mercy eventually figures out who did the killing but not before she is kidnapped and sexually assaulted by him. In order for her to move on, she must come to terms emotionally and physically with this tragedy.

Bone Crossed
Bone Crossed begins with the arrival of Stefan, Mercy's vampire friend, on the floor of her living room, flayed, starved, and barely recognizable. He warns her that Marsilia, the Mistress of his seethe, is aware of her involvement in the death of one of her get, Andre, and tells her to run. The Mistress has had a pair of crossed bones placed on Mercy's door, magicked so they can't be removed, as a sign to other vampires and minions that she is a traitor. While Stefan is recovering, he accidentally floods Mercy's mind with his, reliving the deaths of his menagerie, and Adam brings her into the pack to snap her out of it. The vampires place a magical trap in Uncle Mike's, the fae tavern, that kills one of the pack, though she is revived. The wolves need to negotiate peace with Marsilia, and Mercy needs to get out of town.

Amber, a friend of Mercy's from college shows up to ask Mercy if she will come to their house to investigate her son's claims that there is a ghost in the house. Mercy discusses it with Adam, Samuel, and Bran, who tell her that there is only one powerful supernatural creature in Amber's home city of Spokane, the vampire Jim Blackwood, called The Monster. They believe that he will not notice her, so she will be safe there. Unfortunately, he is one of Amber's husband's biggest clients, and he has an invite to the house, including dinner the first day she's there. In the two nights she is at the house, he bites her and exchanges blood with her twice, claiming her as one of his "sheep", of which she learns Amber is another. The second night she wakes in the middle of the night to find Stefan there, and Amber's son Chad in a room full of frost, frozen to his bedclothes, and not breathing. They save Chad and advise the family to run, heading back to the Tri-Cities. Stephan exchanges blood with Mercy to claim her from Blackwood.

When they get back, two rebellious vampires from the seethe (not made by the Mistress and not easily disposed of because of who their maker is) come to Stefan separately to ask him to help them remove Marsilia. He refuses, keeping his word to the Mistress. Shortly after they both have made their requests, Marsilia summons the wolves and Mercy to a 'meeting' to discuss peace. At the meeting she questions Bernard and Estelle, the rebellious vampires, with an old chair that detects whether the person sitting in it is being truthful. Then she questions Mercy and Stephan, her questions proving that he is no longer hers: this makes his testimony that of a third party, and she uses it to have Estelle killed and Bernard returned to his maker.

Soon after Mercy returns home, Amber's husband Corban appears and stuns Mercy with a taser, and brings her to Blackwood because The Monster has Chad. He has killed Amber, but keeps her animated corpse around to do chores. Mercy, Chad, Corban, and a tree fae called Oakman are kept in cages under the house. Blackwood can absorb the power of whatever person/creature he feeds on. The Oakman allows him to be active in daylight, and Mercy's walker blood will allow him to command ghosts. Stefan finds her, and she convinces him to save Chad, on the condition that should she survive, he will be forgiven for the deaths of the two people he had killed in Blood Bound. The fae walking stick shows up and Mercy gives it to the Oakman on his request. She escapes her cage, and while she is fighting Blackwood, the fae throws it at the vampire's back, staking him. Stefan and Mercy return to the Tri-Cities, where Stefan learns that Marsilia did not kill his people, but merely cut his ties to them so that he would think them dead. He agrees to return to the seethe, but on  his own terms.

Silver Borne
When mechanic and shapeshifter Mercy Thompson attempts to return a powerful Fae book she'd previously borrowed in an act of desperation, she finds the bookstore locked up and closed down. It seems the book contains secret knowledge-and the Fae will do just about anything to keep it out of the wrong hands. And if that doesn't take enough of Mercy's attention, her friend Samuel is struggling with his wolf side-leaving Mercy to cover for him, lest his own father declare Sam's life forfeit. All in all, Mercy has had better days. And if she isn't careful, she might not have many more to live...

River Marked
Car mechanic Mercy Thompson has always known there was something different about her, and not just the way she can make a VW engine sit up and beg. Mercy is a shapeshifter, a talent she inherited from her long-gone father. She's never known any others of her kind. Until now.

An evil is stirring in the depths of the Columbia River—one that her father's people may know something about. And to have any hope of surviving, Mercy and her mate, the Alpha werewolf Adam, will need their help...

Frost Burned
Mercy and her stepdaughter Jesse are on a shopping trip. Startled by Jesse's question when she (Mercy) and her father are having a baby, Mercy crashes her car, the "Rabbit", into an SUV. Jesse tries to call her dad, but he doesn't pick up. Mercy gets worried and tries to reach him through their mating/pack bond, but she only feels anger, rage and pain. Something isn't right. Also no other member of the pack picks up their phones.

A weird message from Bran (The Marrok, ruler of the North American werewolves) arrives ... "The Game is Afoot" ...

Night Broken
Adam's ex-wife, Christy Hauptman, calls in, she is in distress. A lover she met is chasing her and she needs protection. Mercy agrees to take her in and to find out what is happening. Despite Mercy's kindness, Christy tries to paint her in a bad light and the pack seems inclined to listen to her.

Christy is not Mercy's only problem. The night of Christy's arrival a Gray Lord, Alistair Beauclaire, shows up. He wants the walking stick back, which Mercy had given to Coyote. Now she needs to find Coyote, which isn't as easy as it may seem ...

Hollow (short story)
After considering the future of her mechanic shop, Mercy is approached by a woman named Lisa to handle a ghost haunting the home of a rich man. Along with the newest pack member Zack, Mercy investigates the trouble only to discover it is much worse than expected.

Hopcross Jilly (comic)
While taking a quick run during the full moon, Mercy and Adam's pack come across a ritual burial site with skeletal remains of four children. Across the site is an old abandoned house that was once owned by an old and mysterious woman known as Hopcross Jilly. They discovered that she was an ancient fae that hunted down naughty children to eat their fingers and toes and bury their bodies in the cardinal directions. Meanwhile, Mercy's stepdaughter Jesse is having a tough time at school due to both the recent discovery of the burial sites and being the daughter of a werewolf. During this rough period, she befriends a new student named Jill who appears friendly to Jesse, yet acts strange.

Fire Touched
After encountering a troll, Mercy takes a young boy into the packs' protection while declaring the Tri-cities their territory against all others. The young boy, a fire touched human who had been snatched by the fae centuries earlier and trapped in underhill since, is wanted by the fae for the power he possesses. Mercy's declaration has long reaching consequences, and to stave off a possible war, Bran sunders her pack from the packs of America, leaving them to face the consequences alone.

Silence Fallen
Mercy has found her voice in the werewolf pack. But when Mercy's bond with the pack and her mate is broken, she'll learn what it truly means to be alone...

Storm Cursed
After Mercy declares the Tri-Cities under the protection of the pack in Fire Touched, Mercy and Adam's home became a neutral ground - a place where humans would feel safe to come and treat with the fae. The reality is that nothing and no one is safe. As generals and politicians face off with the Gray Lords of the fae, a storm is coming and her name is Death. Released May 2019.

Smoke Bitten
A fae breaks out of Underhill and sets about killing people. Can Mercy strike a bargain that will save everyone from its path? Released March 17, 2020.

Soul Taken
The vampire Wulfe is missing. When Mercy starts to investigate, she discovers more than just Wulfe have disappeared. Mercy learns of the legend of the Harvester, who travels by less-trodden paths and reaps the souls that are ripe with a great black scythe. Set to be released August 23, 2022.

Mercy #14
Title TBA; release scheduled for 2023.

Characterization

Physical appearance
Mercy is described in the novels as being of average height, around 5′6″, and average weight with long, straight, dark brunette hair (often kept in braids).  She has a muscular build, from studying shisei kai kan, and tanned skin. Identifying marks include a tattoo of a coyote paw print - or a werewolf paw print depending on who is asking -  on her belly, below her navel, and buckshot scars on her behind. In coyote form, she weighs 32 lbs. Her adoptive parents died seventeen years ago when she was fourteen; Mercy is approximately 31 years old at the start of Moon Called.

Personality traits, abilities, and interests
Mercy is described as being stubborn, headstrong, independent, hardworking, thoughtful, caring, and having a faith that has saved her at least once from a 'Vampire Queen'. She can change between human and coyote form at will. In coyote form, she is slightly faster, has much better sight in the dark, and a slightly better sense of smell. In both human and coyote form, she has an acute sense of smell and a resistance to some forms of magic. It has been shown that she has the ability to see (and control) ghosts. It is explained that this is the reason Walkers are so rare—vampires have hunted them down to prevent them from being "vampire hunters" because wherever vampires reside, there are usually ghosts of victims to reveal them.

She works as an auto mechanic and deliberately annoys her neighbor Adam, keeping increasingly decrepit and dismantled cars on her lawn (For a good time call...).

Character history
Mercy grew up in Bran's (i.e. the Marrok, a name taken from King Arthur's round table) pack because her teenage mother did not know how to raise her, as she had no knowledge of the supernatural prior to seeing her baby turn into a coyote. Her mother had been in a relationship with Joe Old Coyote (a young rodeo rider) who died before they found out she was pregnant. Joe Old Coyote was a real person that the Native American god Coyote walked in for a time (more or less making Mercy the 'daughter' of Coyote). Hence her ability to turn into a coyote at will.

Joe Old Coyote was killed by vampires (who made it look like a car accident) because he had destroyed a nest prior to getting involved with Mercy's mother. Coyote claims he got his inspiration from Star Wars.

At a young age, Mercy almost ran away with Sam/Samuel because she thought they were in love. Bran warned her that he mostly only wanted her as a "Brood Mare" because she could bear him children, unlike female werewolves who cannot carry a child to term. At that point she left the Marrok's pack and returned to live with her mother until graduating from college with a degree in history and later finding work as a mechanic for a grumpy old fae named Zee.

References

External links
Patricia Briggs - Official Website

Characters in fantasy literature
Literary characters introduced in 2006
Fictional characters from Washington (state)
Fictional characters who can move at superhuman speeds
Fictional characters with superhuman senses
Fictional vampire hunters
Fictional spiritual mediums
Fictional coyotes
Fictional Blackfoot people
Fictional mechanics
Fictional therianthropes
Fictional demigods
Fictional Native American women